Hattingh is a surname. Notable people with the surname include:

Chris Hattingh, South African politician
Grant Hattingh (born 1990), South African rugby union player
Ian Hattingh (born 1964), South African rugby union player
Ilze Hattingh (born 1996), South African tennis player